Lu Kai (198 – December 269 or January 270), courtesy name Jingfeng, was a Chinese military general and politician of the state of Eastern Wu during the Three Kingdoms period of China. Born in the influential Lu clan of the Wu region towards the end of the Eastern Han dynasty, Lu Kai started his career around the beginning of the Three Kingdoms period as a county chief and later a military officer under Sun Quan, the founding emperor of Eastern Wu. During the reign of Sun Liang, he participated in some battles against bandits and Eastern Wu's rival state Cao Wei, and was promoted to the rank of General. Throughout the reign of Sun Xiu and early reign of Sun Hao, Lu Kai continued to hold military commands until September or October 266, when Sun Hao appointed him and Wan Yu as the Left and Right Imperial Chancellors of Eastern Wu respectively. Well known for being outspoken and candid, Lu Kai strongly objected to Sun Hao's decision to move the imperial capital from Jianye (present-day Nanjing, Jiangsu) to Wuchang (present-day Ezhou, Hubei) in 265, attempted to dissuade Sun Hao from going to war with the Jin dynasty that replaced the Cao Wei state in 266, and spoke up against Sun Hao's cruel and extravagant ways on numerous occasions. Although Sun Hao deeply resented Lu Kai for openly defying him, he tolerated Lu Kai because Lu Kai held an important office and also because he did not want to antagonise the Lu clan. After Lu Kai's death, Sun Hao sent his family away to a distant commandery in the south.

Family background
Lu Kai was from Wu County, Wu Commandery, which is present-day Suzhou, Jiangsu. The Lu clan, which he was from, was one of the four most influential clans in Wu Commandery and also in the Jiangdong (or Wu) region at the time. He was also a relative of Lu Xun, the third Imperial Chancellor of Eastern Wu.

Service under Sun Quan
Lu Kai started his career around the time Sun Quan established the independent state of Eastern Wu in 222 near the beginning of the Three Kingdoms period. He first served as the Chief of Yongxing County (永興縣; present-day Xiaoshan District, Hangzhou, Zhejiang) and later as the Chief of Zhuji County, before he was commissioned as a Commandant Who Establishes Martial Might and given command of troops. While serving in the military, Lu Kai was often seen reading books. He was particularly interested in the Taixuanjing and fortune-telling / divination.

During the Chiwu era (238–251) of Sun Quan's reign, Lu Kai was appointed as the Administrator of Dan'er Commandery (儋耳郡; around present-day Danzhou, Hainan). He led Wu forces to attack Zhuya (朱崖; present-day Haikou, Hainan) and succeeded in conquering it for Wu. As a reward for his achievement, he was promoted from Commandant to Colonel under the title "Colonel Who Establishes Martial Might".

Service under Sun Liang
In 255, during the reign of the second Wu emperor Sun Liang, Lu Kai led Wu forces to attack bandits led by Chen Bi in Lingling Commandery (零陵郡; around present-day Yongzhou, Hunan) and succeeded in eliminating Chen Bi and the bandits. He was then promoted to Lieutenant-General and appointed as the Area Commander of Baqiu (巴丘; present-day Yueyang, Hunan), in addition to being enfeoffed as a Marquis of a Chief District. He was subsequently reassigned to serve as the Area Commander of the Right Section of Wuchang (武昌; present-day Ezhou, Hubei).

During Sun Liang's reign, Lu Kai participated in a military campaign against Wu's rival state, Wei, at Shouchun (壽春; present-day Shou County, Anhui). After he returned from the Shouchun campaign, he was promoted to the rank of General, first under the title "General Who Defeats Wei" and later "General Who Pacifies Distant Lands".

Service under Sun Xiu
After Sun Xiu came to the throne on 30 November 258, he appointed Lu Kai as General Who Attacks the North and granted him the nominal appointment of Governor of Yu Province, which was actually the territory of Wu's rival state Wei.

Service under Sun Hao
When Sun Hao became emperor of Wu on 3 September 264 following Sun Xiu's death, he reassigned Lu Kai to the position of General Who Guards the West, granted him the appointment of Governor of Jing Province, and ordered him to station at Baqiu (巴丘; present-day Yueyang, Hunan). He also elevated Lu Kai from the status of a district marquis to a county marquis under the title "Marquis of Jiaxing".

Advising Sun Hao against relocating the imperial capital
In late September or October 265, Sun Hao relocated the Wu imperial capital from Jianye (present-day Nanjing, Jiangsu) to Wuchang (武昌; present-day Ezhou, Hubei). His decision to relocate the imperial capital became a heavy burden on the people of Yang Province as they were hard-pressed into providing supplies and resources for the relocation process. At the same time, the Wu government's numerous policy failures had also imposed hardships on the people and forced them into severe poverty. Around this time, Lu Kai wrote a memorial to Sun Hao to dissuade him from relocating the imperial capital, and to advise him to rule with benevolence.

Dissuading Sun Hao from attacking the Jin dynasty
In February or March 266, Sun Hao sent Ding Zhong as his emissary to make peace with the Jin dynasty, which replaced Wu's rival state Wei on 4 February 266. After Ding Zhong returned from his mission, he urged Sun Hao to launch an attack on the Jin dynasty's Yiyang Commandery (弋陽郡; around present-day Xinyang, Henan) because he saw that the Jin defences were inadequate. When Sun Hao called for an imperial court session to discuss this issue, Lu Kai spoke up: 

The Wu general Liu Zuan urged Sun Hao to seize this opportunity to launch an attack, and suggested that they send spies to assess the situation in Yiyang Commandery first. Although Sun Hao wanted to heed Liu Zuan's suggestion, he eventually dropped the idea after considering the recent fall of Wu's ally state Shu in 263.

As Left Imperial Chancellor
Around September or October 266, Sun Hao appointed Lu Kai as Left Imperial Chancellor and Wan Yu as Right Imperial Chancellor.

As Sun Hao was known for his dislike of receiving feedback about himself, his subjects did not dare to defy him when they spoke to him. Lu Kai, however, told the emperor: "If a ruler and his subjects don't understand each other, when something unexpected happens, everyone will be at a loss on what to do." Sun Hao listened to Lu Kai and allowed feedback from him.

At the time, Sun Hao had an attendant, He Ding, who was notorious for fawning on the emperor, speaking ill of officials behind their backs, and giving unfair preferential treatment to those who were close to him. Lu Kai once reprimanded him:  He Ding bore a grudge against Lu Kai for this, and he constantly thought of ways to get back at Lu Kai. However, Lu Kai remained unfazed and continued to perform his duties in a professional and impartial manner. He continued to show his sincerity and loyalty towards Sun Hao by being candid and not mincing his words whenever he gave advice to the emperor.

Alleged plot to overthrow Sun Hao
According to one account, sometime in January or early February 267, Lu Kai plotted with Ding Feng and Ding Gu to overthrow Sun Hao while he was visiting the imperial ancestral temple, and replace him with Sun Xiu's son. Lu Kai then secretly instructed an official to recommend Ding Feng to lead the 3,000 imperial guards escorting Sun Hao to the temple. However, Sun Hao rejected the suggestion and chose Liu Ping instead. Lu Kai and the others then contacted Liu Ping and asked him to join the plot. Although Liu Ping refused to participate, he also promised them that he would not reveal anything. Without Liu Ping's help, the plot could not be carried out. Around the same time, an imperial clerk Chen Miao warned Sun Hao that there were ominous signs (e.g. dark clouds but no rain, winds changing direction) so Sun Hao, being superstitious, ordered his guards to be on high alert.

The Wu Lu recorded that Lu Kai had instructed his son Lu Yi to secretly contact Liu Ping and ask him to join their plot. However, before Lu Yi could tell him, Liu Ping, who was not on good terms with Ding Feng, smiled and told Lu Yi: "I heard that a wild boar broke into Ding Feng's camp. That is a bad omen." Lu Yi thought that Liu Ping already knew, so he became fearful and did not dare to say anything about the plot.

Death
When Lu Kai became critically ill in 269, Sun Hao sent Dong Chao, the Prefect of the Palace Writers, to visit Lu Kai and hear his last words. Lu Kai said: 

Lu Kai died sometime between 11 December 269 and 8 January 270 at the age of 72 (by East Asian age reckoning).

Family
Lu Kai's son, Lu Yi, also served in the state of Eastern Wu like his father. He started his career as a Gentleman of the Yellow Gate before enlisting in the Wu army and rising through the ranks to become a Lieutenant-General. After his father's death, Lu Yi was reassigned to serve in the imperial palace, where he became an attendant to the crown prince.

During this time, the state historian Hua He wrote a memorial to the emperor Sun Hao as follows: "Lu Yi is physically tough, exceptionally talented, and strong in willpower. He will make a brilliant military commander; even Lu Su could not have been better than him. When he was summoned to the Imperial Capital, he passed by Wuchang but he did not stop to visit his family there and did not take any military equipment and supplies from Wuchang. He shows decisiveness and determination in leading troops, and great integrity in performing his duties. Xiakou is a strategic location near the border that will come under attack by enemy forces, so we need a competent commander to lead the defence. After careful consideration, I think there is no better person suitable for this task than Lu Yi."

When Lu Kai was still alive, he was known for being outspoken and critical of Sun Hao, and for defying the emperor's will on a number of occasions. As a result, Sun Hao secretly bore a grudge against him. At the same time, He Ding, who also hated Lu Kai, constantly spoke ill of Lu Kai in front of the emperor. Sun Hao had long considered getting rid of Lu Kai, but he could not do so because of two reasons. First, Lu Kai held an important office as Left Imperial Chancellor so Sun Hao needed his help to keep the government functioning. Second, Lu Kai's relative Lu Kang was a senior general guarding the border between Eastern Wu and the Jin dynasty, so Sun Hao did not want to antagonise Lu Kang by harming Lu Kai. Therefore, even though Sun Hao deeply resented Lu Kai, he tolerated Lu Kai all these years. After Lu Kai died, Sun Hao sent his family away to the distant Jian'an Commandery (建安郡; covering parts of present-day Fujian).

Lu Kai had a younger brother, Lu Yin, who served as a military general in Eastern Wu.

Lu Kai's writings

Memorial on relocating the imperial capital and benevolent rule
Lu Kai then wrote this memorial to Sun Hao around September or October 265 to dissuade the emperor from relocating the imperial capital from Jianye (present-day Nanjing, Jiangsu) to Wuchang (武昌; present-day Ezhou, Hubei), and to advise him to rule with benevolence instead of tyranny. A rough translation of the memorial is as follows:

Memorial on 20 ways Sun Hao deviated from Sun Quan's practices
Chen Shou, the third-century historian who wrote Lu Kai's biography in the Sanguozhi, mentioned that during his research on information about Lu Kai, he came across a memorial allegedly written by Lu Kai to Sun Hao. This memorial originated from sources in Jing and Yang provinces. However, when Chen Shou cross-checked with sources from the Wu region, he was unable to verify the authenticity of the memorial. Nevertheless, Chen Shou believed that the memorial was authentic from its tone and writing style. He theorised that Lu Kai most probably wrote the memorial but did not present it to Sun Hao and kept it hidden until he finally decided to show it to Dong Chao before his death. Chen Shou did not include the memorial in the main text of Lu Kai's biography because of its dubious origin. However, he was impressed after reading the memorial, and believed that it could serve as a lesson for future rulers, hence he included it as an addendum at the end of Lu Kai's biography.

The memorial was Lu Kai's response to a message from Sun Hao relayed to him by Zhao Qin, one of Sun Hao's close attendants, when Lu Kai strongly opposed Sun Hao's decision to relocate the imperial capital from Jianye (present-day Nanjing, Jiangsu) to Wuchang (present-day Ezhou, Hubei). The message was: "I will definitely follow in the Previous Emperor's footsteps. What is wrong with that? What you told me doesn't make sense. I decided to move the Imperial Capital because the Imperial Palace in Jianye isn't an auspicious location. Besides, the buildings in the western part of the Imperial Palace are already falling apart. That is why all the more I should relocate the Imperial Capital. What makes you think I shouldn't do that?"

Lu Kai replied:

Other memorials
The Jiang Biao Zhuan recorded two other memorials written by Lu Kai to Sun Hao. Lu Kai wrote the first memorial to urge Sun Hao to mend his ways when he foresaw that Sun Hao would meet his downfall because of his cruelty and extravagance. He wrote the second memorial to dissuade Sun Hao from proceeding with his expensive palace construction/renovation project after Sun Hao refused to listen to him when he first spoke up.

See also
 Lists of people of the Three Kingdoms

Notes

References

 Chen, Shou (3rd century). Records of the Three Kingdoms (Sanguozhi).
 Pei, Songzhi (5th century). Annotations to Records of the Three Kingdoms (Sanguozhi zhu).

198 births
269 deaths
Chinese chancellors
Eastern Wu generals
Eastern Wu politicians
Political office-holders in Hainan
Political office-holders in Hubei
Politicians from Suzhou